Haizhu Square is a public square located in Yuexiu District, Guangzhou, China. It is located on the riverfront. Its centrepiece is the Guangzhou Liberation Statue, erected in 1959. In 1963 the square and its environs were named as one of the Eight Sights of Guangzhou.

Haizhu Square Station of the Guangzhou Metro is located in the square.

References

Yuexiu District